Lahore is the core of Pakistan's media and arts scene. Pakistan's film industry is based in the city and is called Lollywood. Many films are filmed in Lahore and the city has some of the oldest film studios in the country.

Films which have been shot in, or have plots based in the city of Lahore are:

 Awarapan
 Bol (film)
 Bhowani Junction (film)
 Daughters of Today
 Donkey in Lahore
 Dil Bole Hadippa!
 Earth (1998 film)
 Gadar: Ek Prem Katha
 Henna (film)
 Kalank
 Khuda Kay Liye
 Lahore (film)
 Larki Punjaban
 Mughal E Azam (1960 film)
 Pinjar (film)
 Salakhain
 Shararat
 Tere Pyar Mein
 Teri Yaad (film)
 Veer-Zaara
 Virsa
 The Reluctant Fundamentalist (film)

 
Lahore-related lists
Lists of films by setting